The 2016 Czech Rally Championship season was an international rally championship. The championship was contested by a combination of regulations with Group R competing directly against Super 2000 and WRC cars for points.

The championship began in Klatovy on 29 April and concluded in Příbram on 2 October. The championship was held over six events.

Calendar

Championship standings
The 2016 Czech Rally Championship for Drivers points was as follows:

{|
|valign="top"|

References

External links

Results

Czech Rally Championship seasons
Czech
rally